Khursand Rural District is a rural district (dehestan) in the Central District of Shahr-e Babak County, Kerman Province, Iran. At the 2006 census, its population  (including Khursand, was subsequently split off from the rural district and promoted to city status) was 13,057, in 2,887 families; excluding Khursand, the population (as of 2006) was 5,210, in 1,224 families. The rural district has 39 villages.

References 

Rural Districts of Kerman Province
Shahr-e Babak County